Pandora Project may refer to:

The Pandora Project a 1998 action thriller film
Pandora's Project, a US nonprofit organization that provides support to survivors of sexual assault
Project Pandora, a US Department of Defense project on the possible uses of microwaves for human electronic harassment